Tipahato is a former summer residence in Cascade, Frederick County, Maryland that combines Italianate and bungalow design features, as well as Queen Anne and Colonial Revival design.  This very large house was built in 1906.

Tipahato was listed on the National Register of Historic Places in 2001.

References

External links
, including photo in 2000, at Maryland Historical Trust

Houses on the National Register of Historic Places in Maryland
Italianate architecture in Maryland
Houses completed in 1906
Houses in Frederick County, Maryland
National Register of Historic Places in Frederick County, Maryland
1906 establishments in Maryland